The greenish yellow finch (Sicalis olivascens) is a species of bird in the family Thraupidae.
It is found in the central Andes of Argentina, Bolivia, Chile and Peru.
Its natural habitats are subtropical or tropical high-altitude shrubland and heavily degraded former forest.

References

greenish yellow finch
Birds of the Puna grassland
greenish yellow finch
Taxonomy articles created by Polbot